The Japan Under-19 cricket team represents Japan in Under-19 cricket players at the international level. Outside of the ICC full-member nations, under-19 international cricket is generally limited to tournament play, and outside of global events (run by the International Cricket Council), Japan’s involvement has been relatively limited, only dating back to 2007, where they participated in the East Asia-Pacific Regional Under-19 qualifier for the first time.

History 
The 2007 East Asia-Pacific Regional Qualifier was Japan’s first involvement in an ICC event at Under 19 level, having become an Associate nation in 2005. This tournament, hosted in Vanuatu, was a qualifier for the 2008 Under 19 World Cup – 31 nations took part in the qualifying tournaments, 5 of which would eventually continue to the tournament proper in Malaysia. Japan lost by 10 wickets after being dismissed for 37 by Papua New Guinea in the opening game of the tournament, by 347 runs to Vanuatu, and then by 387 runs to Fiji. Japan lost the 3rd place playoff by 10 wickets to Fiji, finishing last.

The 2009 edition of the tournament expanded to five teams and did not provide direct qualification to the subsequent Under-19 World Cup. Instead, it provided qualification for the top two finishers to the 2009 Under-19 World Cup Qualifier in Canada, which was a pathway to the 2010 Under-19 World Cup, hosted in New Zealand. Japan did not win a game in this tournament, although spinner Raheel Kano was named in the team of the tournament. The 2011 tournament, hosted on Australia’s Sunshine Coast, was notable for Japan’s only victory to date, defeating Fiji by 24 runs.

Japan did not participate in the East Asia-Pacific regional qualifying tournament again until 2019, participating as hosts, with games held at the Sano International Cricket Ground, also the headquarters of the Japan Cricket Association. Japan defeated Samoa by 174 runs in their first game with Kazumasa Takahashi scoring 68 (92) and taking 4/14. In their second game, a 70 run victory over Vanuatu, captain Marcus Thurgate top scored with 58 (82) and 14-year old legspinner Masato Morita taking 4/38. Their final group game was a 4 wicket win over Fiji, with 15-year old offspinner Yugandar Rethrekar taking 5/18. The final of the tournament was scheduled against 5-time winners Papua New Guinea, before PNG unexpectedly forfeited after 11 players were suspended after a shoplifting incident in Japan, resulting in Japan’s first qualification for a global ICC event.

2020 Under 19 Cricket World Cup 
Japan’s first World Cup in any form of the game started with a game against New Zealand in Potchefstroom which was washed out after New Zealand scored 195/2 off 28.5 overs. They were comprehensively beaten by India in their second game in Bloemfountein, being dismissed for 41 before India chased down the target with 45.1 overs remaining. Their final group game against Sri Lanka in Potchefstroom was similar to the second, being dismissed for 43 and conceding the target within 9 overs. Japan lost their playoff quarter-final against England at Potchefstroom by 9 wickets. Japan in their 13th place playoff semi-final against Canada at Ibbies Oval, were dismissed for 118 in pursuit of Canada’s 300/7. Neel Date scored a tournament-high 59 (75) in this game, with eight 4s. Their final game came in the 15th place playoff against Nigeria at Potchefstroom, where they lost by 8 wickets defending 115.

Players

Current squad

Records (Youth One Day Internationals)

Grounds
The Sano International Cricket Ground is the only international standard ground in Japan, serving as the headquarters of the Japan Cricket Association. The redevelopment of a turf wicket square in 2016 for the ICC Women’s World T20 Qualifier was funded partially by investment from ICC East Asia-Pacific member federations, Cricket Australia and New Zealand Cricket, and also included a three-lane net facility. One of the playing conditions for higher levels of cricket as recognised by the ICC are natural turf surfaces, which are not readily available in non-cricket playing countries owing to the specialised nature of the infrastructure involved. As such, the development of a turf block in Sano serves as a stepping stone to the hosting of further international cricket in Japan.

References

Under-19 cricket teams
Japan in international cricket
Cricket